The Nilotic peoples are people indigenous to the Nile Valley who speak Nilotic languages. They inhabit South Sudan, Sudan, Ethiopia, Uganda, Kenya, the Democratic Republic of the Congo, Rwanda, Burundi and Tanzania. Among these are the Burun-speaking peoples, Karo peoples, Luo peoples, Ateker peoples, Kalenjin peoples, Datooga, Dinka, Nuer, Atwot, Lotuko, and the Maa-speaking peoples.

The Nilotes constitute the majority of the population in South Sudan, an area that is believed to be their original point of dispersal. After the Bantu peoples, they constitute the second-most numerous group of peoples inhabiting the African Great Lakes region around the East African Rift. They make up a notable part of the population of southwestern Ethiopia as well.

The Nilotic peoples primarily adhere to Christianity and traditional faiths, including the Dinka religion. Some Nilotic peoples also adhere to Islam.

Name
The terms "Nilotic" and "Nilote"' were previously used as racial subclassifications, based on anthropological observations of the supposed distinct body morphology of many Nilotic speakers. Twentieth-century social scientists have largely discarded such efforts to classify peoples according to physical characteristics, in favor of using linguistic studies to distinguish among peoples. They formed ethnicities and cultures based on a shared language. Since the late 20th century, however, social and physical scientists are making use of data from population genetics.

Nilotic and Nilote are now mainly used to refer to the various disparate people who speak languages in the same Nilotic language family. Etymologically, the terms Nilotic and Nilote (singular nilot) derive from the Nile Valley; specifically, the Upper Nile and its tributaries, where most Sudanese Nilo-Saharan-speaking people live.

Ethnic and linguistic divisions

Languages

Linguistically, Nilotic people are divided into three subgroups:
 Eastern Nilotic – Spoken by Nilotic populations in southwestern Ethiopia, eastern South Sudan, northeastern Uganda, western Kenya, and northern Tanzania, it includes languages such as Turkana and Maasai.
 Bari
 Teso–Lotuko–Maa
 Southern Nilotic – Spoken by Nilotic populations in western Kenya, northern Tanzania, and eastern Uganda, it includes Kalenjin and Datog.
 Kalenjin
 Omotik-Datooga
 Western Nilotic – Spoken by Nilotic populations in South Sudan, Sudan, northeastern Congo (DRC), northern Uganda, southwestern Kenya, northern Tanzania, and southwestern Ethiopia, it includes the Dinka-Nuer languages, Luo languages, and the Burun languages.
 Dinka–Nuer-Atwot
 Luo languages
 Burun languages

Ethnic groups

Nilotic people constitute the bulk of the population of South Sudan. The largest of the Sudanese Nilotic peoples are the Dinka, who have as many as 25 ethnic subdivisions. The next-largest groups are the Nuer, followed by the Shilluk.

The Nilo-Semitic people in Uganda includes the Luo peoples(Acholi, Alur, Adhola.

Whilst Nilo-Hamitic people in Uganda includes the Ateker peoples (Iteso, Kumam, Karamojong, Lango, who despite speaking a mixture of Luo words, have Atekere origins, Sebei, and Kakwa).

In East Africa, the Nilotes are often subdivided into three general groups:
 The Plain Nilotes speak Maa languages and include the Maasai, Samburu, and Turkana peoples
 The River Lake Nilotes include the Joluo (Kenyan Luo), who are part of the larger Luo group
 The Highland Nilotes are subdivided into two groups, the Kalenjin and the Datog.
 Kalenjin: Elgeyo, Kipsigis, Marakwet, Nandi, Pokot, Sabaot, Lembus, Terik and Tugen [Keiyo]
 Datog: represented mainly by the Barabaig and small clusters of other Datog speakers

History

Origins

A proto-Nilotic unity, separate from an earlier undifferentiated Eastern Sudanic unity, is assumed to have emerged by the third millennium BC. The development of the proto-Nilotes as a group may have been connected with their domestication of livestock. The Eastern Sudanic unity must have been considerably earlier still, perhaps around the fifth millennium BC (while the proposed Nilo-Saharan unity would date to the Upper Paleolithic about 15 thousand years ago). The original locus of the early Nilotic speakers was presumably east of the Nile in what is now South Sudan. The Proto-Nilotes of the third millennium BC were pastoralists, while their neighbors, the proto-Central Sudanic peoples, were mostly agriculturalists. Nilotic people practised a mixed economy of cattle pastoralism, fishing, and seed cultivation. Some of the earliest archaeological findings on record, that describe a similar culture to this from the same region, are found at Kadero, 48 m north of Khartoum in Sudan and date to 3000 BC. Kadero contains the remains of a cattle pastoralist culture and a cemetery with skeletal remains featuring sub-Saharan African phenotypes. It also contains evidence of other animal domestication, artistry, long-distance trade, seed cultivation, and fish consumption. Genetic and linguistic studies have demonstrated that Nubian people in Northern Sudan and Southern Egypt are an admixed group that started off as a population closely related to Nilotic people. This population later received significant gene flow from Middle Eastern and other East African populations. Nubians are considered to be descendants of the early inhabitants of the Nile valley who later formed the Kingdom of Kush, which included Kerma and Meroe and the medieval Christian kingdoms of Makuria, Nobatia, and Alodia. These studies suggest that populations closely related to Nilotic people long inhabited the Nile Valley as far as southern Egypt in antiquity.

Early expansion

Language evidence indicates an initial southward expansion out of the Nilotic nursery into far southern Sudan beginning in the second millennium BC,
the Southern Nilotic communities that participated in this expansion eventually reached western Kenya between 1000 and 500 BC. Their arrival occurred shortly before the introduction of iron to East Africa.

Expansion out of the Sudd
Linguistic evidence shows that over time, Nilotic speakers, such as the Nuer, Dinka, Shilluk, and Luo, took over. These groups spread from the Sudd marshlands, where archaeological evidence shows that a culture based on transhumant cattle raising had been present since 3000 BCE, and the Nilotic culture in that area may thus be continuous to that date.

The Nilotic expansion from the Sudd Marshes into the rest of South Sudan seems to have begun in the 14th century. This coincides with the collapse of the Christian Nubian kingdoms of Makuria and Alodia and the penetration of Arab traders into central Sudan. From the Arabs, the South Sudanese may have obtained new breeds of humpless cattle. Archaeologist Roland Oliver notes that the period also shows an Iron Age beginning among the Nilotic. These factors may explain how the Nilotic speakers expanded to dominate the region.

Shilluk

By the 16th century, the most powerful group among the Nilotic speakers were the Cøllø (called Shilluk by Arabs and Europeans), who spread east to the banks of the white Nile under the legendary leadership of Nyikang, who is said to have ruled Läg Cøllø c from around 1490 to 1517. The Cøllø gained control of the west bank of the river as far north as Kosti in Sudan. There they established an economy based on cattle raising, cereal farming, and fishing, with small villages located along the length of the river. The Cøllø developed an intensive system of agriculture, and the Cøllø lands in the 17th century had a population density similar to that of the Egyptian Nile lands.

One theory is that pressure from the Cøllø drove the Funj people north, who would establish the Sultanate of Sennar.
The Dinka remained in the Sudd area, maintaining their transhumance economy.

While the Dinka were protected and isolated from their neighbours, the Cøllø were more involved in international affairs. The Cøllø controlled the west bank of the White Nile, but the other side was controlled by the Funj sultanate, with regular conflict between the two. The Cøllø had the ability to quickly raid outside areas by war canoe, and had control of the waters of the Nile. The Funj had a standing army of armoured cavalry, and this force allowed them to dominate the plains of the sahel.

Cøllø traditions tell of Rädh Odak Ocollo who ruled around 1630 and led them in a three-decade war with Sennar over control of the White Nile trade routes. The Cøllø allied with the Sultanate of Darfur and the Kingdom of Takali against the Funj, but the capitulation of Takali ended the war in the Funj's favour. In the later 17th century, the Cøllø and Funj allied against the Dinka, who rose to power in the border area between the Funj and Cøllø. The Cøllø political structure gradually centralized under the a king or reth. The most important is Rädh Tugø (son of Rädh Dhøköödhø) who ruled from circa 1690 to 1710 and established the Cøllø capital of Fashoda. The same period had the gradual collapse of the Funj sultanate, leaving the Cøllø in complete control of the White Nile and its trade routes. The Cøllø military power was based on control of the river.

Southern Nilotic settlement in East Africa
Starting in the mid-19th century, European anthropologists and later Kenyan historians have been interested in the origins of human migration from various parts of Africa into East Africa. One of the more notable broad-based theories emanating from these studies includes the Bantu expansion. The main tools of study have been linguistics, archaeology and oral traditions.

Oral traditions
The significance of tracing individual clan histories in order to get an idea of Kalenjin groups formation has been shown by scholars such as B.E. Kipkorir (1978). He argued that the Tugen first settled in small clan groups, fleeing from war, famine, and disease, and that they arrived from western, eastern, and northern sections. Even a section among the Tugen claims to have come from Mount Kenya.

The Nandi account on the settlement of Nandi displays a similar manner of occupation of the Nandi territory. The Kalenjin clans who moved into and occupied the Nandi area, thus becoming the Nandi tribe, came from a wide array of Kalenjin-speaking areas.

Apparently, spatial core areas existed to which people moved and concentrated over the centuries, and in the process evolved into the individual Kalenjin communities known today by adopting migrants and assimilating original inhabitants.

For various reasons, slow and multigenerational migrations of Nilotic Luo peoples occurred from South Sudan into Uganda and western Kenya from at least 1000 AD, and continuing until the early 20th century. Oral history and genealogical evidence have been used to estimate timelines of Luo expansion into and within Kenya and Tanzania. Four major waves of migrations into the former Nyanza province in Kenya are discernible starting with the people of Jok (Joka Jok), which is estimated to have begun around 1490–1517. Joka Jok were the first and largest wave of migrants into northern Nyanza. These migrants settled at a place called Ramogi Hill, then expanded around northern Nyanza. The people of Owiny' (Jok'Owiny) and the people of Omolo (Jok'Omolo) followed soon after (1598-1625). A miscellaneous group composed of the Suba, Sakwa, Asembo, Uyoma, and Kano then followed. The Suba originally were Bantu-speaking people who assimilated into Luo culture. They fled from the Buganda Kingdom in Uganda after the civil strife that followed the murder of the 24th Kabaka of Buganda in the mid-18th century and settled in South Nyanza, especially at Rusinga and Mfangano islands. Luo speakers crossed Winam Gulf of Lake Victoria from northern Nyanza into South Nyanza starting in the early 17th century.

Post-colonial traditions

Several historical narratives from the various Kalenjin subtribes point to Tulwetab/Tulwop Kony (Mount Elgon) as their original point of settlement in Kenya. This point of origin appears as a central theme in most narratives recorded after the colonial period. One of the more famous accounts states:

... The Kalenjin originated from a country in the north known as Emet ab Burgei, which means, the warm country. The people are said to have traveled southwards passing through Mount Elgon or Tulwet ab Kony in Kalenjin. The Sabaot settled around the slopes of the mountain while the others travelled on in search of better land. The Keiyo and Marakwet settled in Kerio Valley and Cherangani Hills. The Pokot settled on the northern side of Mount Elgon and later spread to areas north of Lake Baringo. At Lake Baringo, the Tugen separated from the Nandi and the Kipsigis. This was during a famine known as Kemeutab Reresik, which means, famine of the bats. It is said that during this famine a bat brought blades of green grass which was taken as a sign of good omen signifying that famine could be averted through movement to greener pastures. The Tugen moved and settled around Tugen Hills while the Kipsigis and the Lembus Nandi moved to Rongai area. The Kipsigis and Nandi are said to have lived as a united group for a long time but eventually were forced to separate due to antagonistic environmental factors. Some of these were droughts and invasion of the Maasai from Uasin Gishu.

Geographical barriers protected the southerners from Islam's advance, enabling them to retain their social and cultural heritage and their political and religious institutions. The Dinka people were especially secure in the Sudd marshlands, which protected them from outside interference, and allowed them to remain secure without a large armed forces. The Shilluk, Azande, and Bari people had more regular conflicts with neighbouring states

Culture and religion

Most Nilotes continue to practice pastoralism, migrating on a seasonal basis with their herds of livestock. Some tribes are also known for a tradition of cattle raiding.

Through lengthy interaction with neighbouring peoples, the Nilotes in East Africa have adopted many customs and practices from Southern Cushitic groups. The latter include the age set system of social organization, circumcision, and vocabulary terms.

In terms of religious beliefs, Nilotes primarily adhere to traditional faiths, Christianity and Islam. The Dinka religion has a pantheon of deities. The Supreme, Creator God is Nhialic, who is the God of the sky and rain, and the ruler of all the spirits.
He is believed to be present in all of creation, and to control the destiny of every human, plant, and animal on Earth. Nhialic is also known as Jaak, Juong, or Dyokin by other Nilotic groups, such as the Nuer and Shilluk. Dengdit or Deng, is the sky God of rain and fertility, empowered by Nhialic.
Deng's mother is Abuk, the patron goddess of gardening and all women, represented by a snake.
Garang, another deity, is believed or assumed by some Dinka to be a god suppressed by Deng; his spirits can cause most Dinka women, and some men, to scream. The term Jok refers to a group of ancestral spirits.

In the Lotuko mythology, the chief God is called Ajok. He is generally seen as kind and benevolent, but can be angered. He once reportedly answered a woman's prayer for the resurrection of her son. Her husband, however, was angry and killed the child. According to the Lotuko religion, Ajok was annoyed by the man's actions and swore never to resurrect any Lotuko again. As a result, death was said to have become permanent.

Genetics

Y DNA

A Y-chromosome study by Wood et al. (2005) tested various populations in Africa for paternal lineages, including 26 Maasai and 9 Luo from Kenya, and 9 Alur from the Democratic Republic of Congo. The signature Nilotic paternal marker Haplogroup A3b2 was observed in 27% of the Maasai, 22% of the Alur, and 11% of the Luo.

Haplogroup B is another characteristically Nilotic paternal marker. It was found in 22% of Luo samples, 8% of Maasai, and 50% of Nuer peoples. The E1b1b haplogroup has been observed at overall frequencies around 11% among Nilo-Saharan-speaking groups in the Great Lakes area, with this influence concentrated among the Maasai (50%). This is indicative of substantial historic gene flow from Cushitic-speaking males into these Nilo-Saharan-speaking populations. In addition, 67% of the Alur samples possessed the E2 haplogroup.

The Y-DNA of populations in the Sudan region were studied, with various local Nilotic groups included for comparison. The signature Nilotic A and B clades were the most common paternal lineages amongst the Nilo-Saharan speakers, except those inhabiting western Sudan. There, a prominent North African influence was noted. Haplogroup A was observed amongst 62% of Dinka, 53.3% of Shilluk, 46.4% of Nuba, 33.3% of Nuer, 31.3% of Fur, and 18.8% of Masalit. Haplogroup B was found in 50% of Nuer, 26.7% of Shilluk, 23% of Dinka, 14.3% of Nuba, 3.1% of Fur, and 3.1% of Masalit. The E1b1b clade was also observed in 71.9% of the Masalit, 59.4% of the Fur, 39.3% of the Nuba, 20% of the Shilluk, 16.7% of the Nuer, and 15% of the Dinka. The atypically high frequencies of the haplogroup in the Masalit was attributed to either a recent population bottleneck, which likely altered the community's original haplogroup diversity, or to geographical proximity to E1b1b's place of origin in North Africa. The clade "might have been brought to Sudan [...] after the progressive desertification of the Sahara around 6,000–8,000 years ago". Similarly, Afro-Asiatic influence was seen in the Nilotic Datog of northern Tanzania, 43% of whom carried the M293 subclade of E1b1b.

mtDNA

Unlike the paternal DNA of Nilotes, the maternal lineages of Nilotes in general show low-to-negligible amounts of Afro-Asiatic and other extraneous influences. An mtDNA study examined the maternal ancestry of various Nilotic populations in Kenya, with Turkana, Samburu, Maasai, and Luo individuals sampled. The mtDNA of almost all of the tested Nilotes belonged to various sub-Saharan macro-haplogroup L subclades, including L0, L2, L3, L4, and L5. Low levels of maternal gene flow from North Africa and the Horn of Africa were observed in a few groups, mainly by the presence of mtDNA haplogroup M and haplogroup I lineages in about 12.5% of the Maasai and 7% of the Samburu samples, respectively.

Autosomal DNA
The autosomal DNA of Nilotic peoples has been examined in a study  on the genetic clusters of various populations in Africa. According to the researchers, Nilotes generally form their own African genetic cluster, although relatively most closely related to other Nilo-Saharan populations followed by Niger-Congo speakers. The authors also found that certain Nilotic populations in the eastern Great Lakes region, such as the Maasai, showed some additional Afro-Asiatic affinities due to repeated assimilation of Cushitic-speaking peoples over the past 5000 or so years.

Overall, Nilotic people and other Nilo-Saharan groups are closely related to Niger-Congo speakers of West and Central Africa. Both groups are inferred to have diverged from a common ancestor around 28,000 years ago, perhaps somewhere in the Sahel. Most Nilotic peoples have predominant to exclusive West/East African ancestry, although some groups display varying degrees of West-Eurasian admixture, mostly mediated indirectly through pastoralists from the Horn of Africa.

Admixture analysis
In 121 African populations, four African American populations, and 60 non-African populations, results indicated a high degree of mixed ancestry reflecting migration events. In East Africa, all population groups examined had elements of Nilotic, Cushitic and Bantu ancestry amongst others to varying degrees. By and large, genetic clusters were consistent with linguistic classification with notable exceptions including the Luo of Kenya. Despite being Nilo-Saharan speakers, the Luo cluster with the Niger-Kordofanian-speaking populations that surround them. This indicates a high degree of admixture occurred during the southward migration of southern Luo. Kalenjin groups and Maasai groups were found to have less Bantu ancestry, but significant Cushitic ancestry.

Physiology

Physically, Nilotes are noted for their typically very dark skin color and slender, tall bodies. They often possess exceptionally long limbs, particularly their distal segments (fore arms, lower legs). This characteristic is thought to be a climatic adaptation to allow their bodies to shed heat more efficiently.

Sudanese Nilotes are regarded as one of the tallest peoples in the world.

In terms of facial features,  the nasal profile most common amongst Nilotic populations is broad, with characteristically high index values ranging from 86.9 to 92.0. Lower nasal indices are often found amongst Nilotes who inhabit the more southerly Great Lakes region, such as the Maasai, which is attributed to genetic differences.

Additionally, the Nilotic groups presently inhabiting the African Great Lakes region are sometimes smaller in stature than those residing in the Sudan region.

Many Nilotic groups excel in long- and middle-distance running. This sporting prowess may be related to their exceptional running economy, a function of slim body morphology and very long, slender legs (particularly lower legs, i.e., calf muscles and ankles.). For 404 elite Kenyan distance runners, 76% of the international-class respondents identified as part of the Kalenjin ethnic group and 79% spoke a Nilotic language.

References

Further reading

; Also see Supplementary Data
(cf. Appendix A: Y Chromosome Haplotype Frequencies)

External links

 

Ethnic groups in Kenya
Ethnic groups in South Sudan
Ethnic groups in Tanzania
Ethnic groups in Uganda